
This is a list of aircraft in numerical order of manufacturer followed by alphabetical order beginning with 'M'.

Ma

M-Squared Aircraft 
M-Squared Aircraft Inc. St. Elmo, Alabama, United States
 M-Squared Sport 1000
 M-Squared Sprint 1000 FP
 M-Squared Sprint 1000
 M-Squared Sprint 1000 FP
 M-Squared Breese XL
 M-Squared Breese 2 SS
 M-Squared Breese 2 DS
 M-Squared Breese DS
 M-Squared Breese SS
 M-Squared Ultra-X
 M-Squared American Tugz

M&D
(M&D Flugzeugbau, Germany)
 M&D Flugzeugbau JS-MD Single
 M&D Flugzeugbau Samburo

References

Further reading

External links 

 List Of Aircraft (M)

fr:Liste des aéronefs (I-M)